Jennings House may refer to:

Green-Jennings House, Cullman, Alabama, listed on the Alabama Register of Landmarks and Heritage
Kahn-Jennings House, Little Rock, Arkansas
Jennings House, San Diego, California, a San Diego Historic Landmark
William Sherman Jennings House, Brooksville, Florida
Gabriel Jennings House, Dawson Springs, Kentucky, listed on the National Register of Historic Places (NRHP)
Jennings-Salter House, Lancaster, Kentucky
Dr. William Jennings House, Pinckard, Kentucky, listed on the NRHP
Jennings House (Annapolis, Maryland)
Stephen Jennings House, Farmington Hills, Michigan, a Michigan State Historic Site
H. N. Jennings House, Fenton, Michigan, listed on the NRHP
Murphey-Jennings House, Sumner, Mississippi, listed on the NRHP
Jennings-Marvin House, Dryden, New York
Oliver Gould Jennings House, Manhattan, New York
Jennings-Baker House, Reidsville, North Carolina
Jennings–Gallagher House, California, Pennsylvania
Jennings-Brown House, Bennettsville, South Carolina
Janet Jennings House, Monroe, Wisconsin, listed on the NRHP
Ellis Jennings House, Neenah, Wisconsin, listed on the NRHP